The 1953 UMass Redmen football team represented the University of Massachusetts Amherst in the 1953 college football season as a member of the Yankee Conference. The team was coached by Charlie O'Rourke and played its home games at Alumni Field in Amherst, Massachusetts. UMass finished the season with a record of 1–7 overall and 0–3 in conference play.

Schedule

References

UMass
UMass Minutemen football seasons
Umass Redmen football